Chapter 2: Compact.  The second chapter of the 1997 Constitution of Fiji contains Sections 6 and 7 of the Constitution.  They summarize, in "compact" form, the intent and purpose of the Constitution, as well as the goals that it seeks to accomplish.  It establishes the principles on which the Fiji government are to be based, and according to which the Constitution is to be interpreted.

Section 6 sets out the following principles.  They are only a summary; they are dealt with more fully by subsequent chapters of the Constitution.

The rights of all individuals and population groups are to be respected fully.
Property ownership is defined, and protected.  The ownership of Fijian land according to Fijian custom is preserved, along with the ownership of freehold land.  The rights of landlords and tenants under leases of agricultural land are formally recognized and protected.  Indigenous Fijians insisted on this clause, fearful that a future government dominated by Indo-Fijians might try to change the land laws, under which more than eighty percent of the land is still owned by Fijian tribes, but leased by individuals, including Indo-Fijians.  The fear of forced land reform had been one of the pretexts given by instigators and supports of the coup of 1987, which removed an Indo-Fijian supported government from power.
The right of all Fiji citizens "to practice their religion freely and to retain their language, culture and traditions" is guaranteed.  These rights safeguard both indigenous and Indo-Fijian culture; many ethnic Fijians sought a provision to safeguard their strongly Christian traditions from possible future Indo-Fijian attempts at Hinduization if they should gain political power, while many Indo-Fijians were alarmed by the efforts of fundamentalist Christians to enshrine Christianity in the Constitution as the official religion of the republic, a goal that some Christians have continued to push for since.  This Compact enunciates a compromise that is repeated throughout the Constitution: although laced with references to Christianity, the constitution carefully protects the rights of all Fiji citizens to profess, practice both privately and publicly, and propagate all religions.  The language provisions, too, benefit both major population groups.  Increasing use of English, especially among the younger generation, has concerned leaders of both the indigenous and Indo-Fijian communities that a future government might mandate an English-only education system, which, they fear, would lead to the demise of their own languages.  But while English is the main language of most schools, the right of parents to choose schools teaching in Fijian or Hindustani - or any other language - is protected by the Constitution.
The "separate" administrative systems - in other words, the traditional chiefly systems - of the Fijian and Rotuman people are preserved.  The purpose of this is twofold.  Many ethnic Fijians see the rule of their chiefs, each of whom heads a matagali, or clan, as a bulwark against domination by non-Fijians.  Although similar in some respects to the British Peerage system, it is closer to the people, as almost all ethnic Fijians are somewhat closely related to a Ratu (chief), whose power therefore gives the entire clan a direct voice in politics.  The second provision, for the Rotuman administrative system, was to assuage the fears of the Rotuman Islanders of political and cultural domination by the other population groups.  Related more closely to the New Zealand Māoris and other Polynesian peoples than to the Fijians, who are predominantly Melanesian, and numbering only ten thousand, about 1.2 percent of Fiji's total population, they wanted their cultural identity protected, along with a degree of political autonomy.  In 1987, following the coup, Rotuman secessionists had tried to organize a bid for independence from Fiji.  This clause in the Compact may be seen as an attempt to placate them.
All Fiji citizens, of whatever ethnic background, are guaranteed equality before the law.  Their right to make their permanent homes in the Fiji Islands is also protected.
Every Fiji citizen is guaranteed the right to form or join a political party, to participate in electoral campaigns, and to vote and hold political office.  Elections to the House of Representatives are to be free, fair, by secret ballot, and ultimately on the basis of equal suffrage.  This was to redress the grievances of the Indo-Fijian community that under the previous constitution (adopted in 1990), the allocation of specific numbers of seats to particular ethnic communities had greatly overrepresented ethnic Fijians, at their expense.
A government (executive) must be formed that has the support of a majority in the House of Representatives.  Inclusion of a particular political party in the Cabinet (executive) depends on the electoral support for that party in the most recent election.  No political party, however, may be forced to participate in the Cabinet against its will.
In the formation of a government, and in the promotion of legislation or the implementation of administrative policies, full account must be taken of the interests of all communities.  In the event of a perceived conflict in the interests of the different communities, all interested parties are required to negotiate in good faith with a view to reading agreement.  In all such negotiations, however, "the paramountcy of Fijian interests as a protective principle continues to apply, so as to ensure that the interests of the Fijian community are not subordinated to the interests of other communities.  In other words, the interests of all communities must be taken into account and negotiated over, but in the event of a deadlock, indigenous Fijian interests prevail.
Affirmative action and social justice programs are to be set up, in order to secure "effective equality of access to opportunities, amenities or services for the Fijian and Rotuman people, as well as for other communities, for women as well as men, and for all disadvantaged citizens or groups."  Such programs must be based on "an allocation of resources broadly acceptable to all communities."  This provision for affirmative action is meant to guarantee equality of opportunity, not equality of results.  There is a widespread perception among ethnic Fijians that most of the nation's wealth is in Indo-Fijian hands, and this clause was written partly to allay their fears.  It is not race-specific, however: the poor of all communities are intended to benefit.
Equitable power-sharing must be not only political, but also economic and commercial.  The granting of equal political rights to Indo-Fijians must be matched by an economic empowerment of indigenous Fijians, "to ensure that all communities fully benefit from the nation's economic progress."

Section 7 deals with the application of the Compact.  The principles referred to in section 6 are a statement of intentions, only.  They may not be used justiciably; they may not be used as a basis for ruling a law to be constitutional or unconstitutional, unless they are included in other provisions of the Constitution, or in a law made under the constitution.  They are intended, however, to serve as a frame of reference for interpreting the whole constitution.

1997 Constitution of Fiji